Tzahi Elihen (born 3 April 1991) is an Israeli professional association football player contracted to Liga Alef side, Hapoel Beit She'an.

Biography 
Elihen was born in Stockholm, Sweden, to an Israeli father and a Swedish mother who converted to Judaism. His mother committed suicide after suffering from postpartum depression, and when he was five, he moved to Israel with his family. At first, the family lived in Haifa before settling in Ramat Yishai.

Playing career 
Elihen made his professional debut, coming on as a substitute for Eytan Tibi, in a 3–2 loss to Hapoel Haifa on 20 February 2010. In March 2010 he scored his first goal for the team.

International career 
In 2009, Elihen represented Israel at the 2009 Maccabiah Games, winning a bronze medal.

Statistics 
As to 31 July 2014

References

Footnotes 

1991 births
Living people
Israeli footballers
Swedish emigrants to Israel
Association football midfielders
Beitar Jerusalem F.C. players
Hakoah Maccabi Amidar Ramat Gan F.C. players
Bnei Sakhnin F.C. players
Hapoel Ramat Gan F.C. players
Hapoel Migdal HaEmek F.C. players
Hapoel Beit She'an F.C. players
Maccabiah Games medalists in football
Competitors at the 2009 Maccabiah Games
Israeli Premier League players
Liga Leumit players
Footballers from Northern District (Israel)
Maccabiah Games bronze medalists for Israel